Turold of Bayeux was one of the Norman knights known from both the Bayeux tapestry and Domesday Book. 
Turold was named on the Bayeux tapestry, and could be depicted as a messenger in red. He is believed to have been a vassal of Odo of Bayeux, Bishop of Bayeux and is recorded as holding land from Odo in Kent in the Domesday Book in 1086.  

He became Constable of Bayeux, but lost power when Bishop Odo was disgraced.

Appearance on the Bayeux Tapestry 
The Bayeux tapestry mentions a small number of important figures by name. When they are mentioned, their name is depicted directly above their head. For this reason, some believe that Turold is not the messenger in red who would later become Constable of Bayeux, but the man who appears to have a form of dwarfism and is holding the messenger's horse's reins. It should also be noted that Turold was a common name at the time of the creation of the tapestry, and it is possible that both figures bear the name "Turold".

Turoldus in the Chanson de Roland 
The dwarf figure appears to be a jongleur or minstrel based on his wide breeches and flared tunic, leading some to further conjecture that he could be Turoldus as mentioned in the Chanson de Roland. Jongleurs of this era could be extremely skilled, therefore could reasonably be the mysterious author or performer of that poem. However, as Turold and its derivatives were popular names at the time of the creation of the oldest surviving copy of the Chanson de Roland, it is also possible the Turoldus mentioned is a third and entirely different person than those shown on the Bayeux Tapestry. This is the prevailing hypothesis among modern historians.

See also
 Turoldus the poet.
 Turold de Brémoy

References

Normans
Norman conquest of England